Maria Aparecida Gonçalves (born 1962 in Clementina) is a Brazilian advertiser person, feminist activist, consultant in public politics of gender and violence against women and current Minister of Women.

Acting in militancy for women's rights, Cida coordinated the process of articulation and foundation of the Popular Movements Center in Brazil. Cida was advisor at the Woman Coordination of the State Secretariat of Social Assistance, Citizenship and Labour of Mato Grosso do Sul in one of the José Miranda administrations as governor in the beginning of the 2000s and also in Lula and Rousseff presidencies as National Secretary of Violence Against Women. She is graduated in Advertising and Marketing.

Minister of Women
In December 2022, Cida was announced as Minister of Women of the third Lula administration, assuming office on 1 January 2023.

References

1962 births
Living people
Women's rights activists
Workers' Party (Brazil) politicians
Women government ministers of Brazil
Government ministers of Brazil
21st-century Brazilian women politicians